Losser is a municipality and a town in the eastern Netherlands. It is at the eastern end of the A1 motorway.

Population centres

Losser
The oldest known reference to Losser dates from the tenth century. Originally, the village consisted of two separate parts. Both were almost completely destroyed when on 21 September 1665, troops from Münster set fire to them.

One of the town's oldest buildings is the Martinustoren (St. Martin's Tower), dating from around 1500 and the only remaining part of a church demolished in 1903.

Geography
A few kilometers west of De Lutte, close to the border with Oldenzaal, lies the Tankenberg, a hill the top of which (85 m) is the highest point in the province. (For myths of the Tankenberg, see Tanfana.)

The municipality's most important body of water is the river Dinkel.

Sister cities
Losser is twinned with:

Notable people 
 Pi de Bruijn (born 1942 in Losser) a Dutch architect  
 Kim Kötter (born 1982 in Losser) a Dutch director, model and beauty pageant titleholder 
 Moniek Nijhuis (born 1988 in Overdinkel) a Dutch swimmer, competed in the 2012 Summer Olympics

Gallery

References

External links

Official website

 
Municipalities of Overijssel
Populated places in Overijssel
Twente